Telestes polylepis is a species of ray-finned fish in the family Cyprinidae. It is a freshwater fish.
It is found only in a 100-metre stretch of a Croatian stream.
Its natural habitat is rivers.
It is threatened by new species of Pike being introduced to its stream as well as habitat loss. People think they may be extinct within the next few years as there are less than 80 left.

References

Telestes
Fish described in 1866
Taxonomy articles created by Polbot